Floris may refer to:

People

Given name
 Five counts of Holland:
Floris I, Count of Holland (c.1017–1061)
Floris II, Count of Holland (c.1085–1121)
Floris III, Count of Holland (1141–1190)
Floris IV, Count of Holland (1210–1234)
Floris de Voogd (c.1228–1258), interim count of Holland, and guardian of Floris V
Floris V, Count of Holland (1254–1296)
Floris of Zeeland (c.1255–1297), stadholder of Zeeland
Floris Arntzenius (1864–1925), Dutch painter, water-colourist, illustrator and printmaker
Floris van den Berg (born 1973), Dutch philosopher and skeptic
Floris Jan Bovelander (born 1966), Dutch field hockey player
Floris Braat (born 1979), Dutch slalom canoeist
Floris Cohen (born 1946), Dutch historian of science
Floris De Tier (born 1992), Belgian racing cyclist
Floris Diergaardt (born 1980), Namibian football striker
Floris van Dijck (c.1575–1651), Dutch still life painter
Floris van Egmont (c.1470–1539), Dutch nobleman, stadtholder of Guelders and Friesland 
Floris Evers (born 1983), Dutch field hockey player
Floris Gerts (born 1992), Dutch racing cyclist
Floris Goesinnen (born 1983), Dutch racing cyclist
Floris van der Haer (1547–1634), Flemish clergyman and history writer
Floris Adriaan van Hall (1791–1866), Dutch nobleman and statesman, Prime Minister of the Netherlands 1853 / 1861
Floris van Imhoff (born 1964), Dutch curler
Floris Isola (born 1991), French football midfielder
Floris Jansen (born 1962), Dutch cricketer
Floris Jespers (1889–1965), Belgian Avant-garde painter
Floris Kaayk (born 1982), Dutch digital artist
Flóris Korb (1860–1930), Hungarian architect
Floris van der Linden (born 1996), Dutch football forward
Floris of Montmorency (1528–1570), Flemish noble and diplomat
Floris Nollet (1794–1853), Belgian physicist, engineer and inventor
Prince Floris of Orange-Nassau, van Vollenhoven (born 1975), nephew of Queen Beatrix
Floris Osmond (1849–1912), French engineer and metallographer
Floris van Schooten (c.1586–1656), Dutch still life painter
Floris Stempel (1877–1910), Dutch founder and chairman of football club Ajax
Floris Takens (1940–2010), Dutch mathematician
Floris Verster (1861–1927), Dutch painter
Floris de Vries (born 1989), Dutch golfer
Floris van Wevelinkhoven (c.1315–1393), Bishop of Münster and Bishop of Utrecht

Surname
Anna Floris (born 1982), Italian tennis player
Frans Floris (1517–1570), Flemish historical and portrait painter
Gianluca Floris (born 1964), Italian writer and belcanto singer
Maria Eizaguerri Floris (born 2004), Spanish chess master
Roberto Floris (born 1986), Argentine football defender
Sandro Floris (born 1965), Italian sprinter

Fiction
 Floris and Blancheflour, a medieval literature story that was common in many languages in the Middle Ages
 Floris (TV series), a 1969 Dutch TV series and the title character
 Floris (film), a 2004 film based on the TV series

Other
Floris, Iowa, United States
Floris, Virginia, United States
Floris of London, a London-based perfumer

See also

Florissant (disambiguation), United States
Florist
Fiore (disambiguation)

Dutch masculine given names